Giuseppe Galante (2 September 1937 – 20 December 2021) was an Italian rower.

Galante was born in Domaso on 2 September 1937. He won a silver medal at the 1960 Summer Olympics and a European title in 1961 in the coxless four. He then changed to the coxed four and won a silver medal at the 1964 Summer Olympics and a bronze at the 1964 European Championships. His team finished fourth at the 1968 Games. Galante died on 20 December 2021, at the age of 84.

References

1937 births
2021 deaths
Italian male rowers
Olympic rowers of Italy
Rowers at the 1960 Summer Olympics
Rowers at the 1964 Summer Olympics
Rowers at the 1968 Summer Olympics
Olympic silver medalists for Italy
Sportspeople from the Province of Como
Olympic medalists in rowing
Medalists at the 1964 Summer Olympics
Medalists at the 1960 Summer Olympics
European Rowing Championships medalists